Raymond Peter Miller (February 12, 1888 – April 7, 1927) was a Major League Baseball first baseman who played for one season. He played 19 games for the Cleveland Indians during the 1917 Cleveland Indians season and six games for the Pittsburgh Pirates during the 1917 Pittsburgh Pirates season.

External links

1888 births
1927 deaths
Major League Baseball first basemen
Baseball players from Pennsylvania
Houston Astros players
McKeesport Tubers players
Lima Cigarmakers players
Falls City Colts players
Akron Champs players
Columbus Senators players
Omaha Rourkes players
Oakland Oaks (baseball) players
Kansas City Blues (baseball) players
Beaumont Exporters players
Dallas Submarines players
Texarkana Twins players
Pittsburgh Pirates players